Foteini (before 1926: Φωτίνιστα - Fotinista) is a village in Kastoria Regional Unit, Macedonia, Greece.

The Greek census (1920) recorded 29 people in the village. Following the Greek-Turkish population exchange, in 1926 within Fotinista there were 34 refugee families from Pontus. The Greek census (1928) recorded 119 village inhabitants. There were 34 refugee families (94 people) in 1928.

References

Populated places in Kastoria (regional unit)